Hanging Around (originally titled Is Mr Death In?, an anagram of the name of its director) is a 1996 film directed by Damien Hirst, which was made for The Hayward Gallery's Spellbound exhibition. The exhibition opened 100 years to the day (21 February 1896) the Lumiere Brothers brought their newly invented cinematograph to a London audience. The film has only been seen at this exhibition, and once on network television in the UK at 23:50 on 30 November 1996.

Cast
The cast included Keith Allen, Eddie Izzard, Trevor Peacock, Katrine Boorman, Maia Norman and Connor Hirst.

References

External links
 

1996 films
British short films
1996 comedy films
1990s English-language films